Gul Mohammad , sometimes referred to as Gul Mahomed, (15 October 1921 – 8 May 1992) played Test cricket for India and Pakistan. He was educated at Islamia College, Lahore.

Gul Mohammad was a small man who stood only 5' 5, but a brilliant attacking left-handed batsman and fine fielder in the covers. He made his first-class debut at the age of 17 and hit 95 in his first match in the Bombay Pentangular. In 1942/43, he scored 144 for Bijapur Famine XI against Bengal Cyclone XI and added 302 with Vijay Hazare. On a slow, flat wicket, the first innings of the two teams added up to 1376 runs.

Gul Mohammad's most famous innings is the 319 that he scored for Baroda against Holkar in the final of the 1946/47 Ranji Trophy . Gul joined Vijay Hazare with the score at 91 for 3 and when he was out 533 minutes later, they had added 577 runs, then a world record for any wicket in first-class cricket. Hazare scored 288 in ten and a half hours. During the course of the innings, they bettered the Indian record of 410 between Lala Amarnath and Rusi Modi  and the world record of 574* by Frank Worrell and Clyde Walcott. 

Gul Mohammad toured England in 1946 and Australia in 1947/48 and played Test matches without much success. He highest score was 34 in the second innings at Adelaide while Hazare was scoring his second hundred of the match at the other end. In 1952/53, he played for India in two Tests of Pakistan's first series. For a time, he was a professional with Ramsbottom in the Lancashire League.

He continued to play in Ranji Trophy until he took Pakistan citizenship in 1955.  He played one Test for Pakistan, against Australia in 1956/57 where he scored 12 and 27 not out and hit the winning runs.

He later turned to cricket administration. He was in director board of the Gaddafi Stadium in Lahore till 1987 and then a cricket coach in the Punjab Sports Board. Gul Mohammad died of liver cancer.

See also
List of cricketers who have played for two international teams

References
 Mihir Bose, A History of Indian Cricket
 Christopher Martin-Jenkins, The Complete Who's Who of Test Cricketers
 Remembering Gul Mohammad (Retrieved 10 September 2005)
 Cricketarchive Profile
 Article on the 577 stand

External links

India Test cricketers
Pakistan Test cricketers
Baroda cricketers
Commonwealth XI cricketers
Dual international cricketers
Deaths from liver cancer
1921 births
1992 deaths
Government Islamia College alumni
Pakistani cricketers
Indian cricketers
Lahore cricketers
Muslims cricketers
Punjab (Pakistan) cricketers
Hyderabad cricketers
Northern India cricketers
West Zone cricketers
Cricketers from Lahore
Indian emigrants to Pakistan
People from Lahore